Hassan Bernoussi (born 1965–rabat) is a Moroccan businessman and CEO of the group Interface. He was the director of Morocco's department of foreign investments for 14 years. He studied at the school of Mohammed VI's late cousin Nawfal along with Mounir Majidi.

References

Living people
1965 births
Moroccan civil servants
People from Rabat
Moroccan businesspeople
Moroccan chief executives
Moroccan engineers